Jaka is a Slovenian given name, the Slovenian form for 
Jacob and James, and is also a Javanese name, the standard spelling for Joko. Notable people with the name include:

Jaka Ankerst (born 1989), Slovenian ice hockey player
Jaka Bizilj (born 1971), Slovenian film producer
Jaka Blažič (born 1990), Slovenian professional basketball
Jaka Hvala (born 1993), Slovenian ski jumper
Jaka Tingkir, founder and the first king of the Sultanate of Pajang
Jaka Emeka Abraham aka Mazi Jaka (born 1988), Nigerian freelance writer, Sport journalist and players representative
Almerindo Jaka Jamba (born 1949), Angolan politician and former rebel leader in UNITA
Jaka Jazbec, Italian sprint canoeist who has competed since the mid-2000s
Jaka Klobučar (born 1987), Slovenian professional basketball player
Jaka Lakovič (born 1978), Slovenian professional basketball player
Jaka Mwambi, Tanzanian politician and diplomat
Jaka Singgih (born 1958), Indonesian businessman, Managing Director of Bumi Laut Group
Jaka Štromajer (born 1983), Slovenian football striker
Jaka Železnikar (born 1971), Slovene author of computational poetry and visual art

See also
JAKA Tower, planned office skyscraper in Makati, Philippines
Jaka to Melodia, meaning "What Song is It?", is the Polish variation of the classic game show Name That Tune
Jaka Sembung, a 1981 Indonesian fantasy martial arts film, based on a character of the same name
Si Buta Lawan Jaka Sembung, a 1983 Indonesian sequel to 1981 film Jaka Sembung
Jaka Baring Stadium, a multi-purpose stadium in Palembang, South Sumatra, Indonesia

Slovene masculine given names
Javanese names

it:Jaka
sl:Jaka